Malian Première Division is the top division of football in Mali. Having been created in 1966, it is governed by the Malian Football Federation. The league has been professional since 2004. The official name is Ligue 1 Orange Mali for sponsorship reasons.

The season usually runs from December to late August. The league currently consists of twenty clubs split into two pools and features a round-robin home-and-away schedule within each pool. The top two in each pool qualify for the Championship Play-Off (Carré d'As), which involves a round-robin between the four teams. The winners of the play-off are crowned champions and qualify for the CAF Champions League.

In the 2017 season, the competition started in early January, but in the 6th round, the government dissolved the football association on 9 March and the remaining matches of the round were abandoned. The league did not take place in 2018 but resumed for the 2019-20 season.

Teams (2021-22)

Previous winners

1966: Djoliba AC 
1967: Djoliba AC 
1968: Djoliba AC 
1969: AS Real Bamako 
1970: Stade Malien 
1971: Djoliba AC 
1972: Stade Malien 
1973: Djoliba AC 
1974: Djoliba AC 
1975: Djoliba AC 
1976: Djoliba AC 
1977: no championship
1978: no championship
1979: Djoliba AC 
1980: AS Real Bamako
1980–81: AS Real Bamako 
1982: Djoliba AC 
1983: AS Real Bamako 
1983–84: Stade Malien 
1985: Djoliba AC 
1986: AS Real Bamako 
1987: Stade Malien 
1988: Djoliba AC 
1988–89: Stade Malien
1990: Djoliba AC 
1991: AS Real Bamako 
1991–92: Djoliba AC 
1992–93: Stade Malien 
1993–94: Stade Malien 
1994–95: Stade Malien 
1995–96: Djoliba AC 
1996–97: Djoliba AC 
1997–98: Djoliba AC 
1998–99: Djoliba AC 
1999–00: Stade Malien 
2000–01: Stade Malien 
2002: Stade Malien 
2002–03: Stade Malien 
2004: Djoliba AC 
2005: Stade Malien
2005–06: Stade Malien 
2007: Stade Malien 
2007–08: Djoliba AC 
2008–09: Djoliba AC 
2009–10: Stade Malien 
2010–11: Stade Malien 
2011–12: Djoliba AC 
2012–13: Stade Malien 
2013–14: Stade Malien 
2014–15: Stade Malien 
2016: Stade Malien 
2017: not awarded (season abandoned)
2018: not played
2019–20: Stade Malien
2020–21: Stade Malien
2021–22: Djoliba AC

Performance by club

Topscorer

References

External links
Malian Football Federation.
TheFarFoot Website.
Fifa.com: Updated results and table from Mali Premiere League.
RSSSF competition history

 
1
Top level football leagues in Africa
1966 establishments in Mali
Sports leagues established in 1966